The , officially the , was a Japanese political party. The party adopted its final name in December 2015, and ended up dissolving in November 2018.

History

Formation
The Japan Restoration Party was formed in 2012 and was led by Tōru Hashimoto and Ishihara. In May 2014 Hashimoto and Ishihara announced that the party had agreed to split due to disagreement over a merger with another opposition party, the Unity Party. Ishihara's faction left the JRP to form the Party for Future Generations, which registered as a party on 1 August 2014. Takeo Hiranuma was chosen as the party's leader and he appointed Hiroshi Yamada as Secretary-General and Ishihara as chief advisor.

Party for Future Generations (2014–2015)

The party suffered a near-wipeout at the 47th general election in December 2014, collapsing from 19 seats in the House of Representatives to just two, with Hiranuma and party advisor Hiroyuki Sonoda the only two of the party's 48 candidates to win a seat. Senior party members who lost their seat included Ishihara, Yamada and policy committee chairman Hiroshi Nakada. The party received 2.65% of the proportional representation vote, just clearing the 2% minimum required to ensure continued existence as an official party within the Diet. Ishihara announced his retirement from politics two days after the election.

Party for Japanese Kokoro (2015–2018)
Following Hiranuma and Sonoda's defection from the party back to the LDP, Kyoko Nakayama was elected unopposed as party leader on 28 August 2015 and officially started a two-year term from 1 October. Secretary-General Shigefumi Matsuzawa initially intended to contest the leadership vote and maintain the party's "unbiased" stance towards the ruling LDP, as opposed to Nakayama wanting to work with the government. Rather than force a vote that would split the party, Matsuzawa instead chose to resign and sit as an independent; his resignation was accepted at the 28 August meeting and Masamune Wada replaced him as secretary-general.

In November 2018, Masashi Nakano, the last member was transferred to LDP. The party was dissolved.

Policies
The party's policies had been described as a combination of conservatism in matters of national security, immigration law, and traditional cultural values, as well as 'liberalism' in economic issues (e.g. regulatory reform).

Members
At the time of the party's name change in December 2015, it had five members in the House of Councillors in the national Diet.  opposed the name change and joined the Initiatives from Osaka party, leaving the party with four members in the national parliament. In April 2016 Kazuyuki Hamada, the only party member facing re-election in the summer 2016 House of Councillors election, resigned from the party to join Initiatives from Osaka. In November 2016 Wada left the party and joined the LDP's parliamentary group within the House of Councillors, but did not officially join the LDP.

In October 2015 the party had a further eight members in regional assemblies.

In November 2018, Nakano rejoined the Liberal Democratic Party.

Presidents of PFJK

Election results

House of Representatives

House of Councillors

See also 
 :Category:Party for Japanese Kokoro politicians

References

External links
 Official website
 Official website of the Party for Future Generations (inactive)

Political parties established in 2014
Conservative parties in Japan
2014 establishments in Japan
Politics of Japan
Conservatism in Japan
Japanese nationalism
Far-right politics in Japan
Right-wing populism in Japan
Anti-communist organizations in Japan
2018 disestablishments in Japan
Political parties disestablished in 2018